American Cooperative School of La Paz or ACS Calvert (ACS), is an American international school in La Paz, Bolivia, serving kindergarten through grade 12.

History
It was founded in 1955, with six students being taught in a house in La Paz. This number grew to 23 students under one teacher the end of 1955. The school expanded due to a wave of Americans coming to Bolivia, and in 1958 the school relocated to the Goethe Institute. Later that year the school moved to Calle 13 Calacoto, and at the same time the Bolivian Ministry of Education approved the "Cooperative Experimental School"'s designation as an experimental school. The United States Agency for International Development (USAID), around 1960, gave the school a grant to purchase a new campus. That year, there were 316 students.

The master plan for the current school campus was completed in 1963. The school attempted to establish a partnership with the Colegio Franklin Delano Roosevelt, The American School of Lima in Lima, Peru; As part of this in 1964 it briefly changed its own name to "Franklin D. Roosevelt School," but the attempted partnership failed and the name changed to American Cooperative School in 1965.

The Southern Association of Colleges and Schools accredited the school in 1968, and during the same year the Bolivian Ministry of Education began to allow graduates of the school to obtain Bolivian bachillerato high school diplomas.

Campuses

The former Calle 13 Calacoto location, as of 2015, houses the Hotel Calacoto.

As of 2015 the only portion of the USAID-purchased campus still remaining is the playground's garden bridge, which is made of stone. When the school purchased the campus the "Casa del Sol" and "Patino House" were already present, and the school later constructed and demolished additional buildings.

References

External links
 American Cooperative School of La Paz
 American Cooperative School of La Paz  

International schools in La Paz
La Paz
1955 establishments in Bolivia
Educational institutions established in 1955
Association of American Schools in South America
Categoría: Colegios Emblemáticos de Bolivia
Categoría: Colegios de Bolivia
Categoría: Colegios Privados de Bolivia